Taungoo Mingaung is one of the Thirty Seven nats in the official pantheon of Burmese nats. He is portrayed sitting crosslegged on a simple couch wearing royal garments, holding a fan in his right hand and resting his left hand on his knee.

According to the writer Hla Thamein, he is the nat representation of Minkhaung II, who was viceroy of Taungoo (r. 1549–1551, 1552–1584) and the third younger brother of King Bayinnaung of Taungoo dynasty. However, Minkhaung II died of natural causes whereas Viceroy Minkhaung I (r. 1446–1451) was brutally assassinated (repeatedly hacked to death by sword). Since death from violent murders is a leitmotif of the Thirty Seven nats, and one of the main criteria for being inducted into the pantheon, the nat may likely be based on Minkhaung I, not Minkhaung II.

References

Bibliography
 
 

06